Renaissance fair may refer to:
Renaissance fair, a festival in the Renaissance historical style
"Renaissance Fair", song by The Byrds, from the album Younger Than Yesterday
"Renaissance Faire", song by Blackmore's Night, from the album Shadow of the Moon